The Tōkai earthquakes are major earthquakes that have occurred regularly with a return period of 100 to 150 years in the Tōkai region of Japan. The Tōkai segment has been struck by earthquakes in 1498, 1605, 1707, 1854, and 1923. Given the historic regularity of these earthquakes, Kiyoo Mogi in 1969 pointed out that another great shallow earthquake was possible in the "near future" (i.e., in the next few decades).

Given the magnitude of the last two earthquakes, the next is expected to have at least a magnitude scale of 8.0 , with large areas shaken at the highest level in the Japanese intensity scale, 7.  Emergency planners are anticipating and preparing for potential scenarios after such an earthquake, including the possibility of thousands of deaths and hundreds of thousands of injuries, millions of damaged buildings, and cities that include Nagoya and Shizuoka devastated. Concern has been expressed over the presence of the Hamaoka Nuclear Power Plant, close to the expected epicentre of a Tōkai earthquake. The Fukushima I Nuclear Power Plant was severely damaged after a large earthquake followed by a tsunami in 2011, causing a  nuclear event of level 7, the highest on the scale.

Shortly after the 2011 Tōhoku earthquake, new reports were released which indicated the significant likelihood of another magnitude 9 earthquake occurring elsewhere in Japan, this time on the Nankai Trough. The reports stated that if a 9.0 earthquake occurred on the Nankai Trough, the effects would be very serious. The quake itself would likely kill thousands, and a series of 34-meter (112-foot) tall tsunamis would impact areas from the Kantō region to Kyūshū, adding thousands to the death toll, and destroying Shizuoka, Shikoku, and other areas with large populations.

Earthquake prediction
The Tokai Earthquake is expected to occur in the near future along the trench near Suruga Bay with a magnitude of around 8. The Tokai region will be subjected to extremely strong shaking with seismic intensity of 6-lower or greater, and huge tsunamis are expected to hit the Pacific coast in the region.

The Japanese government is taking the Tōkai earthquakes seriously and has charged the Japan Meteorological Agency with predicting the next one. There is now a dense array of instruments placed to accumulate a continuous stream of data related to seismicity, strain, crustal expansion, tilt, tidal variations, ground water fluctuations and other variables. They are watching for an anomaly in this data which might precede the next major Tōkai earthquake.

Following the prediction of an earthquake in the relatively near future, and in order to try to predict when it would occur, the Coordinating Committee for Earthquake Prediction (CCEP) designated the Tōkai region as an Area of Specific Observation in 1970, and upgraded it to an Area of Intensified Observation in 1974. Following the passing of the Large-Scale Earthquake Countermeasure Act in 1978, the Earthquake Assessment Committee (EAC) was set up to warn the Prime Minister, via the Japan Meteorological Agency, if the next quake is imminent.

As serious damage from strong shaking and huge tsunamis is expected, the Japanese government has designated this region as Areas under Intensified Measures against Earthquake Disaster.

Information on future quakes is published irregularly. Since November 2017, this information limited to Tokai earthquakes has not been announced, and "Information on the Nankai megathrust earthquake (南海トラフ地震に関連する情報) " targeting the Nankai megathrust earthquakes has been in operation.

Future Tokai earthquakes are expected to occur with the sequence of

 strain accumulation,
 pre-slip and
 earthquake occurrence.

JMA monitors unusual deformation that may accompany pre-slip using strainmeters to support the prediction of its occurrence. As pre-slip may be too slight to be detected by the observation systems currently in place, it is not possible to say that the Tokai Earthquake will be predicted without fail.

Prediction information
To support predictions, JMA has developed a seismic and crustal deformation observation network covering the region in conjunction with related organizations, and observes related data around-the-clock basis. After monthly assessments, or when anomalous data are detected, JMA issues Information on the Tokai Earthquake bulletins to allow emergency measures for earthquake disaster prevention. These are categorized into three types: Investigation Report on Tokai Earthquake Prediction, Tokai Earthquake Watch, and Explanatory Information on Tokai Earthquake Warning. Each report indicates the level of danger using a color code of blue, yellow and red.

To determine whether anomalous phenomena are precursors to the Tokai Earthquake, JMA convenes the Earthquake Assessment Committee for Areas under Intensified Measures against Earthquake Disaster (地震防災対策強化地域判定会), which consists of seismologists and members of governmental organizations. If the Committee concludes that the Tokai Earthquake is imminent, the Director-General of JMA will report this conclusion to the Prime Minister, who will then hold a Cabinet meeting and issue a warning statement (警戒宣言) .

Relation to other major earthquakes
The pattern of historical seismicity reveals that the megathrust surface is segmented, with five separate zones of rupturing identified, conventionally labeled A–E, from west to east. Earthquakes involving the A+B segments are generally referred to as Nankai (literally South Sea) earthquakes, C+D Tōnankai (literally Southeast Sea) earthquakes and E Tōkai (literally East Sea) earthquakes. These earthquakes repeat at intervals generally in the range of 90 – 200 years.

On all but one occasion, rupture of segment C (±D ±E) has been followed by rupture of segments A+B within a few years. This behavior has been reproduced by modeling the viscoelastic response of the megathrust fault plane with lateral variations in both convergence rate and frictional properties.

Historical Tōkai earthquakes

See also
1944 Tōnankai earthquake
 Coordinating Committee for Earthquake Prediction
 Kanto earthquakes
 List of earthquakes in Japan
 Nankai megathrust earthquakes

References

External links
Tokai earthquake information from Japan Meteorological Agency
Tokai earthquake preparedness in Shizuoka prefecture

Megathrust earthquakes in Japan
Earthquake clusters, swarms, and sequences